Kevin Kilner (born May 3, 1958) is an American television and film actor.

Life and career
Kilner was born in Baltimore, Maryland, the son of Dorothea, a kindergarten teacher, and Edward Kilner, who worked in advertising sales and insurance. He went to Dulaney High School in Baltimore County.  He made his first television appearance on an episode of The Cosby Show in 1989.  He is perhaps best known for playing Nick in Smart House as well as the protagonist in the first season of Earth: Final Conflict and Officer Dean in The Stoned Age. 

In 1995-96, Kilner starred in Almost Perfect  as the romantic interest of Nancy Travis, who played a screenwriter, but Kilner was written out of the show in the second-season premiere.  In 2009, he appeared on two episodes of the Joss Whedon show Dollhouse.

Kilner is an alumnus of Dulaney High School and the Johns Hopkins University in Baltimore.  While attending Johns Hopkins he was a member of the National Champion lacrosse team.

From June 30 to July 16, 2006, he appeared on stage in the Alley Theatre production of Wait Until Dark.

Filmography

Film

Television

References

External links
 
 
 

1958 births
Living people
Male actors from Baltimore
American male film actors
American male television actors
Johns Hopkins University alumni
20th-century American male actors
21st-century American male actors
American male stage actors